Colin Anthony "Topper" Carew (born July 16, 1943) is an American film director, screenwriter and producer. He is best known for such films as Talkin' Dirty After Dark and D.C. Cab.  He is also the creator of such television series as Martin.

Filmography

Film

Television

References

External links

 The New Thing Art and Architectural Center (1966-), an autobiographical essay by Topper Carew

Screenwriters from Massachusetts
African-American film directors
American television writers
American television directors
Film producers from Massachusetts
People from Boston
Living people
1943 births
Film directors from Massachusetts
21st-century African-American people
20th-century African-American people